O Espetáculo Dos Circo Dos Horrores (English: The Horrors Of Circus Spectacle) is the seventh album of Brazilian hip hop group Facção Central.

Success 
O Espetáculo Dos Circo Dos Horrores has been considered one of the most classic albums of Brazilian hip hop because of its strong lyrics and heavy beats. Many fans of Facção Central consider this and A Marcha Fúnebre Prossegue (English: The Funeral March Continues) one of the best albums of the group..

Track list

Disc 1
 "O Circo Chegou" (The Circus Arrived)
 "O Espetáculo Dos" Circo Dos Horrores (The Horrors Of Circus Spectacle)
 "Cartilha Do Ódio" (Primer Hate)
 "Castelo Triste" (Sad Castle)
 "Abismo Das Almas Perdidas" (Abyss Of Lost Souls)
 "Interlúdio" (Interlude)
 "Sonhos Que Eu Não Quero Ter" (Dreams That I Don't Want)
 "Aparthaid No Dilúvio De Sangue" (Aparthaid In The Flood Of Blood)
 "Resgate" (Rescue)
 "Homenagem Póstuma" (Posthumous Tribute)
 "Livro De Auto-Ajuda" (Self-Help Book)
 "Sem Limite" (Without Limit)
 "Espada No Dragão" (Dragon's Sword)
 "Aonde o Filho Chora e a Mãe Não Vê" (Where The Child Cries And The Mother Didn't See)

Disc 2
 "A Bactéria FC" (The FC's Bacterium)
 "A Roleta Macabra" (Roulette Macabre)
 "Front De Madeirite" (Front Of Birch)
 "Cortando O Mal Pela Raiz" (Cutting It In The Bud)
 "Pacto Com O Diabo" (Pact With The Devil)
 "Bala Perdida" (Stray Bullet)
 "Tecle Pause" (Press Pause)
 "Memórias Do Apocalipse" (Apocalypse's Memories)
 "A Capela Dos 50.000 Espíritos" (The Chapel Of Fifty Thousand Spirits)
 "Passageiro Da Agonia" (Passenger Of Agony)
 "O Rei Da Montanha" (The Mountain's King)
 "De Mãos Dadas Com O Inimigo" (Hand In Hand With The Enemy)

References

External links
Listen to O Espetáculo do Circo dos Horrores at kboing.com.br

Facção Central albums